The Hydrologic Modeling System (HEC-HMS) is designed to simulate the precipitation-runoff processes of dendritic drainage basins.  It is designed to be applicable in a wide range of geographic areas for solving the widest possible range of problems.  This includes large river basin water supply and flood hydrology, and small urban or natural watershed runoff.  Hydrographs produced by the program are used directly or in conjunction with other software for studies of water availability, urban drainage, flow forecasting, future urbanization impact, reservoir spillway design, flood damage reduction, floodplain regulation, and systems operation.

The program is a generalized modeling system capable of representing many different watersheds.  A model of the watershed is constructed by separating the water cycle into manageable pieces and constructing boundaries around the watershed of interest.  Any mass or energy flux in the cycle can then be represented with a mathematical model.  In most cases, several model choices are available for representing each flux.  Each mathematical model included in the program is suitable in different environments and under different conditions.  Making the correct choice requires knowledge of the watershed, the goals of the hydrologic study, and engineering judgement.

HEC-HMS is a product of the Hydrologic Engineering Center within the U.S. Army Corps of Engineers.  The program was developed beginning in 1992 as a replacement for HEC-1 which has long been considered a standard for hydrologic simulation.  The new HEC-HMS provides almost all of the same simulation capabilities, but has modernized them with advances in numerical analysis that take advantage of the significantly faster desktop computers available today.  It also includes a number of features that were not included in HEC-1, such as continuous simulation and grid cell surface hydrology.  It also provides a graphical user interface to make it easier to use the software.  The program is now widely used and accepted for many official purposes, such as floodway determinations for the Federal Emergency Management Agency in the United States.

GeoHECHMS 
GeoHECHMS is a 2D/3D visualization and editing data wrapper to the HEC-HMS software and is used for stormwater and flood mitigation engineering studies, including production of Federal Emergency Management Agency flood hazard maps and other river engineering studies, land development projects, and bridge and culvert highway transportation projects. 

Features related to HEC-HMS include:
 Undo and redo HEC-HMS editing
 Multiple document interface (MDI) of HEC-HMS projects
 Use of AutoCAD and MicroStation CAD drawings and terrain surfaces
 Use of GIS databases
 Automated drainage basin delineation
 Detention basin design and analysis
 Automated time of concentration (TOC) and lag time computation
 Automated runoff curve number and Infiltration (hydrology)#Green_and_Ampt computation
 Automated report generator using Microsoft Word
 Data sharing with HEC-RAS
 Cloud-based web service to land use maps, digital soil mapping, digital elevation model, and site-specific precipitation

See also
 Hydrology

References

External links
 HEC-HMS Homepage  at the Hydrologic Engineering Center
 GeoHECHMS Homepage at CivilGEO

Hydrology software